Saint Guinefort was a legendary 13th-century French greyhound that received local veneration as a folk saint.

Legend
Guinefort's story is a variation on the well-travelled "faithful hound" motif, similar to the Welsh story of the dog Gelert, or the Indian story of the Brahmin and the Mongoose. 

In one of the earliest versions of the story, described by Dominican monk Stephen of Bourbon in 1250, Guinefort the greyhound belonged to a knight who lived in a castle near Lyon. One day, the knight went hunting, leaving his infant son in the care of Guinefort. When he returned, he found the nursery in chaos – the cradle overturned, the child nowhere to be seen and Guinefort greeted his master with bloody jaws. Believing Guinefort to have devoured his son, the knight slew the dog. He then heard a child crying; he turned over the cradle and found his son lying there, safe and sound, along with the body of a viper bloody from dog bites. Guinefort had killed the snake and saved the child. On realizing the mistake the family dropped the dog down a well, covered it with stones and planted trees around it, setting up a shrine for Guinefort. Upon learning of the dog's martyrdom, the locals venerated the dog as a saint and visited his shrine of trees when they were in need, especially mothers with sick children. 

The local peasants hearing of the dog's noble deed and innocent death, began to visit the place and honor the dog as a martyr in quest of help for their sicknesses and other needs.
Stephen of Bourbon (d. 1262): De Supersticione: On St. Guinefort.

The custom was regarded as harmful and superstitious by the church, which made efforts to eradicate it. As Protestant churches emerged in the 16th century, they "criticized the cult of Guinefort seeing in it an example of the abuses and errors of the Catholic Church."  The Catholic hierarchy adopted the critique, and sought to suppress Guinefort belief and practices, and ostracize practitioners.  A fine for the practice was implemented.  "Despite this early attempt to ridicule and dismiss the cult of Saint Guinefort, the local tradition continued."  The cult of this dog saint persisted for several centuries, despite the repeated prohibitions of the Catholic Church.  Community memory of the practices was still present in the 1970s, with the last known visit by someone to Saint Guinefort Wood to effect a cure for a sick child occurring around the 1940s.

In popular culture
The 1987 French film Le Moine et la sorcière (in the US known as The Sorceress) is a fictionalized story based on Stephen of Bourbon’s original text regarding Saint Guinefort and the local people.

Thomas of Hookton, the main character in Bernard Cornwell's The Grail Quest trilogy (2000–2003), is a mock believer in Saint Guinefort, praying to the saint and wearing a paw on a piece of leather around his neck.

In Adam Gidwitz's 2017 young adult novel The Inquisitor's Tale, the main characters' pet greyhound Gwenforte bears a strong resemblance to Saint Guinefort, especially in the manner of his death and resurrection early in the novel.

See also
Cynocephaly
List of individual dogs
Saint Christopher - a saint often portrayed with the head of a dog
Seven Sleepers - An early Christian (and later Islamic) legend associates them with a watchdog

References

Notes

Citations

Further reading
Saint Guignefort Légende, Archéologie, Histoire in French.

External links
 (the source text for the story)
Holy Dogs and Dog-Headed Saints
The Greyhound Saint

Folk saints
French folklore
Individual dogs
Medieval individual animals
Medieval legends
Medieval Lyon
Individual animals in France
Dogs in France
13th century in France
Dogs in religion
Animals in Christianity